Eray Karadayi (born 19 May 1995) is a Bulgarian professional footballer of Turkish descent, who plays as a forward for Levski Karlovo.

Career

Levski and loan to Neftochimic 
Eray is a former youth player of Levski Sofia. In March 2014, he was loaned out to Neftochimic and he made his professional debut in the A Group on 14 March in a match against Slavia Sofia.

PFC Burgas/Neftochimic 
After his loan to Neftochimic was ended, he was released from Levski and joined Rozova Dolina Kazanlak. In the beginning of 2015 he joined the B Group team PFC Burgas. He made his debut for the team on 8 March 2015 in a match against another local team Chernomorets Burgas, winning the match with two goals difference. Two months later in a match against Sozopol he got a serious injury which took him away from play until the end of 2015. He returned to training with the now called Neftochimic Burgas, after a merge between PFC Burgas and PFC Neftochimic Burgas (2009–14), at the end of November.

Oborishte 
In June 2017, Karadayi signed with Oborishte.

Statistics

Club

References

External links 

1995 births
Living people
Bulgarian footballers
Neftochimic Burgas players
PFC Nesebar players
FC Oborishte players
FC Arda Kardzhali players
FC Lokomotiv Gorna Oryahovitsa players
FC Botev Galabovo players
PFC Dobrudzha Dobrich players
First Professional Football League (Bulgaria) players
Bulgarian people of Turkish descent
Association football forwards